Zhang Yingying is the name of:

Zhang Yingying (table tennis) (born 1983), Chinese table tennis player
Zhang Yingying (runner) (born 1990), Chinese long-distance runner
Yingying Zhang (victim) (1990–2017), Chinese visiting scholar who disappeared in Illinois, USA